Jonas Juozas Žukas (October 29, 1915 in Chicago, Illinois - July 7, 1981) was a Lithuanian basketball and tennis player. He won a gold medal with Lithuania national basketball team during EuroBasket 1937.

Žukas lived in northern Chicago, near Ogden Park, and was known as Joseph "Joe" Zukas. His first visit to Lithuania was in 1930, where he worked as a sports instructor in the physical culture department in Kaunas. He would later be part of a delegation of Lithuanian American athletes from Chicago that went to the 1935 World Lithuanian Congress in Kaunas, and stayed there teaching tennis and being a part of the national basketball team. He played basketball for CJSO Kaunas.

He returned to the United States, and lived in Tucson, Arizona, where he died on July 7, 1981.

References
Footnotes

Bibliography
 Vidas Mačiulis, Vytautas Gudelis. Halė, kurioje žaidė Lubinas ir Sabonis. 1939–1989 – Respublikinis sporto kombinatas, Kaunas, 1989

1915 births
1981 deaths
People from Chicago
American people of Lithuanian descent
FIBA EuroBasket-winning players
Lithuanian men's basketball players

People from Tucson, Arizona